Andrey Golubev and Aleksandr Nedovyesov were the defending champions but lost in the semifinals to Szymon Walków and Jan Zieliński.

Walków and Zieliński won the title after defeating Grégoire Barrère and Albano Olivetti 6–2, 7–5 in the final.

Seeds

Draw

References

External links
 Main draw

2021 ATP Challenger Tour
Split Open